William H. McCauley  (December 20, 1869 – January 27, 1926) was a Major League Baseball player for the Washington Senators. He appeared in one game, on August 31, 1895 and was hitless in two at-bats.

External links

1869 births
1926 deaths
Major League Baseball shortstops
Washington Senators (1891–1899) players
19th-century baseball players
Baseball players from Washington, D.C.